Thomas Edward Hopper (born 14 December 1993) is an English professional footballer who plays as a forward for Colchester United.

Club career

Early career
Tom Hopper began his career with Boston United. Hopper became Boston's youngest ever player, when aged 15 he came on as a substitute for goalscorer Spencer Weir-Daley for the final 13 minutes of a 2–1 Challenge Cup victory over Hucknall Town. In the summer of 2010, Hopper signed for Leicester City and immediately began impressing in the club's youth teams.

Leicester City
Hopper signed his first professional contract with Leicester City in October 2011. On 28 January 2012, Hopper was allocated the number 37 shirt and named on the substitutes bench for Leicester's FA Cup match against Swindon Town. He made his début as an 81st-minute substitute for David Nugent. Leicester won the match 2–0. Hopper said of his debut that "It all seems like a blur, but something I have really enjoyed".

Manager Nigel Pearson was said to be impressed by the youngster. In May 2012, he was named as Leicester City's Academy Player of the Season. Hopper was given the 21 number for the 2012–13 season. On 14 September, Hopper joined Bury on a one-month loan deal. Hopper scored twice in his first six games during a month-long loan spell at Bury, including his first ever professional league goal against Stevenage and Crawley Town. On 16 October Hopper extended his loan at Bury until 3 January 2013, which was then extended for the remainder of the 2012–13 season on 4 January 2013. Hopper's loan spell was cut short and he was sent back to Leicester on 7 February 2013.

Hopper finished the season with Leicester City Development Squad & Academy, helping them to win the 2012–13 Professional Development League 2 and the HKFC International Soccer Sevens cup tournament. Hopper was allocated the number 20 shirt at the beginning of the 2013–14 season and was named as an unused substitute in Leicester's 2–1 Football League Cup win over Wycombe Wanderers on 6 August. He made his first appearance of the season in the next round of the League Cup, replacing Chris Wood in the 66th minute of a 5–2 win at Carlisle United. On 30 May 2014, Hopper signed a new two-year deal.

Hopper was an unused substitute in Leicester's first two Premier League fixtures, against Everton and Chelsea in August 2014.

Scunthorpe United
On 8 January 2015, Hopper joined League One outfit Scunthorpe United on a one-month loan. Hopper made his debut on 10 January 2015, scoring in the 4–1 victory against Walsall. After scoring 4 goals in 4 games, Hopper's loan was extended until the end on the season on 2 February 2015. Hopper was nominated for the Sky Bet League One Player of the Month award for January, missing out to Dele Alli of MK Dons. After his Leicester contract was terminated, he joined Scunthorpe on a permanent basis on 26 June 2015.

Southend United

Hopper signed for Southend United on 15 June 2018 on a three-year deal. He scored on his debut in a 3–2 defeat to Doncaster Rovers.

Lincoln City

Hopper signed for Lincoln City on 23 January 2020 for an undisclosed fee, on a contract running until 2023. On 28 July 2022, Hopper was made the captain of the club following the departure of Liam Bridcutt.

Colchester United
On 26 January 2023, Hopper joined Colchester United for an undisclosed fee.

On 11th February 2023, Hopper scored his first Colchester goal, a close range header in a 1-0 victory away at Grimsby.

Personal life

In May 2015, Hopper and teammates James Pearson and Adam Smith made a sex tape with local women on Leicester's tour of Thailand, which was obtained by the Sunday Mirror. The three players apologised for making the video, which included a racial epithet towards the women. Following the outcome of disciplinary proceedings, the three players had their contracts terminated.

Career statistics

References

External links

1993 births
Living people
People from Boston, Lincolnshire
Footballers from Lincolnshire
English footballers
Association football forwards
Boston United F.C. players
Lincoln City F.C. players
Leicester City F.C. players
Bury F.C. players
Scunthorpe United F.C. players
Southend United F.C. players
Colchester United F.C. players
English Football League players
Sex scandals